Vale is an unincorporated community and census-designated place in Butte County, South Dakota, United States. According to the 2020 census, the population was 130. Vale has been assigned the ZIP code of 57788. The public school located in Vale, whose mascot was The Beet Diggers, closed in 1982.

Vale was so-named because the town site is located in a valley.

Demographics

References

Census-designated places in Butte County, South Dakota
Census-designated places in South Dakota